The Australian Film Institute Award for Best Original Music Score is an award in the annual Australian Film Institute Awards.

Previous winners

See also

References
Afi.org.au – AFI Award Winners

M
Film awards for best score